Richard L. Van Horn (born November 2, 1932) was the seventh president of the University of Houston and the 12th president of the University of Oklahoma.

Van Horn was born in Chicago, Illinois but raised in Fort Wayne, Indiana. Van Horn earned a BS in industrial administration from Yale University; an MBA from the MIT Sloan School of Management; and a PhD in systems science from Carnegie-Mellon University. He spent 16 years at Carnegie-Mellon as a faculty member, associate dean of the Graduate School of Industrial Administration, vice president for business affairs, vice president for management and provost. He went on to serve six years as the president of the University of Houston and the University of Oklahoma. He served as president of Oklahoma from 1989 to 1994. Outside of academia, he spent ten years at the Rand Corporation, a nonprofit global policy think tank.

References

1932 births
People from Chicago
Presidents of the University of Houston
Presidents of the University of Oklahoma
University of Oklahoma faculty
Carnegie Mellon University faculty
University of Houston faculty
Yale University alumni
MIT Sloan School of Management alumni
Carnegie Mellon University alumni
Living people
American academic administrators